Aleksandra Szczygłowska (born 22 March 1998) is a Polish volleyball player, playing in position libero.

Sporting achievements

Clubs 
Polish Supercup:
  2021
Polish Cup:
  2022
Polish Championship:
  2022

References

External links
 BudowlaniTorun profile
 TauronLiga profile
 Women.Volleybox profile
 VolleyballWorld profile
 ChampionsLeague.CEV profile
 CEV profile

1998 births
Living people
Polish women's volleyball players